Gunnar Tolnæs (1879–1940) was a Norwegian-born film actor who worked for most of his career in Denmark.

Early life
He was born in Oslo, Norway.

He started his career with the theatre in 1906, with a long theater career in various Norwegian theaters, along with guest appearances in Copenhagen.

He debuted in film in 1914 in a Swedish-made silent film. The following year he came to Nordisk Film in Denmark, replacing Valdemar Psilander as the company's main star. He had led or co-starred in a total of 27 Danish silent films.

Career
Tolnæs's film credits, all silent films, include:

 Children of the Streets (1914)
 One of the Many (1915)
Himmelskibet (also known as A Trip To Mars) (1918)
 The Maharaja's Favourite Wife (1921)
 The Flight into Marriage (1922)
 Her Little Majesty (1925)
 Sex in Chains (1928)

Death
He died in Oslo at age sixty and is buried with his family at Vestre gravlund.

Notes

External links 

 

1879 births
1940 deaths
Burials at the Cemetery of Our Saviour
Norwegian male film actors
Norwegian male silent film actors
20th-century Norwegian male actors
Male actors from Oslo